Buff Wood is a  biological Site of Special Scientific Interest in Hatley in Cambridgeshire. It is managed by the Wildlife Trust for Bedfordshire, Cambridgeshire and Northamptonshire.

This site is ecologically diverse boulder clay woodland, with a range of wildflowers, including oxlips and the uncommon green hellebore. There are butterflies such as brimstones, large whites, orange-tips and speckled woods.

A permit from the Wildlife Trust is required for access.

References

Sites of Special Scientific Interest in Cambridgeshire
Wildlife Trust for Bedfordshire, Cambridgeshire and Northamptonshire reserves